Bezirk Schärding (Bavarian: Beziak Scharing) is a district of the state of 
Upper Austria in Austria.

Municipalities 
Towns (Städte) are indicated in boldface; market towns (Marktgemeinden) in italics; suburbs, hamlets and other subdivisions of a municipality are indicated in small characters.
Altschwendt
Andorf
Brunnenthal
Diersbach
Dorf an der Pram
Eggerding
Engelhartszell an der Donau
Enzenkirchen
Esternberg
Freinberg
Kopfing im Innkreis
Mayrhof
Münzkirchen
Raab
Rainbach im Innkreis
Riedau
Schardenberg
Schärding
Sigharting
Sankt Aegidi
Sankt Florian am Inn
Sankt Marienkirchen bei Schärding
Sankt Roman
Sankt Willibald
Suben
Taufkirchen an der Pram
Vichtenstein
Waldkirchen am Wesen
Wernstein am Inn
Zell an der Pram

External links 
 Official site

 
Districts of Upper Austria